The Canada Corn Act was passed in 1843 by the British Parliament and allowed Canadian grains to enter the British market at reduced duties. The act was repealed in 1846.

History

Origins
British passage of the Importation Act 1815 – the Corn Law – impacted the market for Canadian grains by restricting their importation into Britain, despite the fact Canada was part of the British Empire.

Enactment
The 1843 act was enacted to provide some relief to grain farmers in Upper Canada, by reducing the duty of Canada wheat imported into Britain to (a nominal) 1 shilling a quarter.

The reduced tariff led to increasingly profitable shipping through the St. Lawrence route. To attract business for shipping businesses in the United States, the American government responded by allowing Canadian grain bound for Britain to pass through the Erie Canal without import duties.

The Act allowed for the importation to the UK of Canadian grain, be it processed or not. Accordingly, a trade sprung up in American grain, shipped to Canada for milling, and then on to the UK. This impetus caused a boom in the Canadian flour-milling industry.

Repeal
After a short time, the advantages to Canada of the Corn Act were undone when British Prime Minister Sir Robert Peel moved Britain towards free trade. A shortage of food caused by the Great Famine of Ireland created the need for cheap imported grain, and the act was repealed in 1846.

This was seen at the time as blow to Canada by abolition of the (effective) imperial preference the act had created; the impact of the repeal to grain exports in practice, in the later 1840s and 1850s, remains a subject of historical debate.

See also
 Corn Laws
 Anti-Corn Law League
 History of agriculture in Canada

References

Sources 
 
Canada Corn Act

Economic history of the United Kingdom
United Kingdom Acts of Parliament 1843
Canada–United Kingdom relations
1843 in Canada
Agriculture legislation in the United Kingdom
Acts of the Parliament of the United Kingdom concerning Canada
Customs duties
Repealed United Kingdom Acts of Parliament
History of agriculture in Canada